Samuel Groth and John-Patrick Smith won the first edition of the tournament by defeating Go Soeda and Yasutaka Uchiyama 6–4, 6–1 in the final.

Seeds

Draw

Draw

References
 Main Draw

2013 Doubles
Kunming Challengerandnbsp;- Doubles